Jambi is a village (desa) in Baron District, Nganjuk Regency, East Java Province, Indonesia.

Populated places in East Java
Nganjuk Regency